Volynets may refer to:
 Volynets (surname)
 Volynets (icebreaker), a steam-powered icebreaker

See also